Cavalier Wildlife Management Area is a  Wildlife Management Area in Chesapeake, Virginia.  It preserves habitat for a number of species, including black bear, canebrake rattlesnakes, white-tailed deer, eastern wild turkeys, and many varieties of songbirds.

The preserve comprises two separate tracts of land. The main tract today is typified by recently logged forestlands planted with young pine.

The area is open to the public for seasonal hunting, trapping, fishing, hiking, and primitive camping. Firearms are prohibited in the Dismal Swamp tract, where only bow-hunting is permitted; firearms may be used for hunting within the main tract. Neither area permits horseback riding.

Cavalier Wildlife Management Area is owned and maintained by the Virginia Department of Game and Inland Fisheries. Access for persons 17 years of age or older requires a valid hunting or fishing permit, or a WMA access permit.

See also
 List of Virginia Wildlife Management Areas

References

External links
Virginia Department of Game and Inland Fisheries: Cavalier Wildlife Management Area
Virginia Department of Game and Inland Fisheries: Dismal Swamp Tract of Cavalier

Wildlife management areas of Virginia
Protected areas of Chesapeake, Virginia
Great Dismal Swamp